Karel Otčenášek (13 April 1920 – 23 May 2011) was a Czech prelate of the Roman Catholic Church.

Early life
Otčenášek was born in České Meziříčí, Czech Republic and was ordained a priest on 17 March 1945.

Career
He became Apostolic Administrator of the Diocese of Hradec Králové on 30 March 1950 and was consecrated bishop on 30 April 1950. From 1951 to 1962, he was imprisoned for having been consecrated without the consent of the government which was legally required during the communist rule of the Czechoslovakia. Otcenášek was appointed bishop of the same diocese (Hradec Králové) on 21 December 1989, where he served until his retirement on 6 June 1998.

He was promoted Archbishop ad personam by John Paul II on 24 September 1998.

External links

 Catholic-Hierarchy
 Diocese of Hradec Králové website

1920 births
2011 deaths
Roman Catholic bishops in Czechoslovakia
Czech archbishops
Recipients of the Order of Tomáš Garrigue Masaryk
People from Rychnov nad Kněžnou District
20th-century Roman Catholic bishops in the Czech Republic